Abing (17 August 1893 – 4 December 1950), born as Hua Yanjun, was a blind Chinese musician specializing in the erhu and pipa.

Life
Abing was born on August 17, 1893, in the eastern Chinese city of Wuxi to father Hua Qinghe, who was a Taoist priest. His mother was a widow, and her remarriage to a priest was resented by her family; she remained depressed and died a year after Abing's birth. Abing was raised by extended family until the age of eight, when he went to live with his father at the temple. Abing was the name used by his family. He was given the official name Hua Yanjun at this time and sent to school.

Abing's father was proficient in a number of musical instruments and Taoist religious music. His father trained him in drums from the age of 10. Abing began learning the dizi at age 12, then the erhu, undergoing a rigorous set of training, such as playing the flute with weights attached to the end of the flute to increase the power of his wrist. At age 17, Abing first performed in religious ceremonies, and won acclaim for his musical talent, presentation, and voice.

In 1914, upon the death of his father, Abing took charge of the temple along with his cousin. However, badly run operations at the temple, and an opium addiction, drove Abing into poverty. At the age of 34, he contracted syphilis and progressively lost sight in both his eyes. He became homeless and earned a living as an itinerant street performer. In 1939, he married Dong Cuidi(董催弟), a country widow in Jiangyin.

After his marriage, Abing performed every afternoon in a public square in Wuxi. He became famous for incorporating topical issues into his music and songs, especially the war with Japan. After the performance, he would walk through the city's streets, playing the erhu. This was a period of prolificacy for Abing, and his most famous composition, Erquan Yingyue, was performed in this period.

After the Japanese takeover of Wuxi, Abing travelled to Shanghai, while his wife went to her home village. In Shanghai, Abing played music for a kunqu opera company. In 1939, he returned to Wuxi and his old routine. However, his musical current affairs commentary also irked the authorities, and after 1945 he was prohibited from singing about news items at his usual place of performance. In 1947, Abing experienced a severe bout of lung disease. He stopped performing, and earned a living repairing huqin.

In the summer of 1950, two professors of the Central Conservatory of Music, Yang Yinliu and Cao Anhe, both Wuxi natives, travelled to Wuxi to record Abing. By this time, Abing had not performed for almost three years. After three days' practice, and in two sessions, three erhu pieces and three pipa pieces were recorded. However, Abing's favourite piece, Meihua Sannong, was not recorded when the team ran out of blank records.

The recording brought Abing wider acclaim, and in September he was offered a teaching position with the Central Conservatory of Music. However, he was by this time too ill to accept, and died on December 4, 1950. He was buried in the graveyard of the temple where he was born. His wife also died three months later.

Influence

Abing's most famous piece is entitled Erquan Yingyue (二泉映月, engl.: The Moon's Reflection on the Second Spring), which is named after a spring in Wuxi (which is today part of Xihui Park). It is still played as a standard erhu piece, although it necessitates a special set of strings that are tuned lower than normal erhu strings.

He was only recorded very late in his life, but despite the scarcity of documentation of his music, he is nevertheless considered to be one of the most important Chinese musicians of the 20th Century.

His signature pieces have become classics of Chinese erhu and pipa music, such as "Erquan Yingyue."

His music can be heard on The Norton Recordings, ninth edition.

Abing's family home in Wuxi was destroyed by floodwaters in 1991, but rebuilt in 1993 and is now a memorial to Abing and his music.

Notes

Further reading
Stock, Jonathan P. J. (1996). Musical Creativity in Twentieth-Century China: Abing, His Music, and Its Changing Meanings. Rochester, New York: University of Rochester Press.
"Musical Narrative, Ideology, and the Life of Abing", Jonathan P. J. Stock, Ethnomusicology, Vol. 40, No. 1 (Winter, 1996), pp. 49–73

External links
Abing biography
China Central Television: The Story of Abing 

Moon Reflected on Second Spring An article about Erquan Yingyue and Abing with three music videos

1893 births
1950 deaths
Chinese blind people
Chinese male composers
Blind musicians
Erhu players
Pipa players
Republic of China musicians
People's Republic of China musicians
Musicians from Wuxi
Chinese composers
20th-century composers
20th-century Chinese male musicians